The Transport Department of the Government of Hong Kong is a department of the civil service responsible for transportation-related policy in Hong Kong. The department is under the Transport and Logistics Bureau.

The Transport Department was created on 1 December 1968 as a separate department within the Hong Kong Government. Prior to 1968 it was assigned to the Transport Office under the Colonial Secretary's department.

History
The Transport Office was founded in 1965 within the Colonial Secretariat, initially with a staff of 23. The office was set up in response to the territory's worsening traffic problems, and was modelled after the systems in Britain and other Commonwealth countries, with the new department taking responsibility for vehicle registration and driver licensing. In 1968, it was spun off as a separate government department, and was renamed as the Transport Department.

In 1974, the department's headquarters moved from the Blake Block on Queensway to the new Murray Road Multi-storey Car Park Building. Around the same time, the department's Chinese name changed from "" to "" to avoid confusion with the similar Chinese name of the Traffic Branch of the Royal Hong Kong Police.

The department's role expanded significantly in April 1982, when it absorbed the Traffic and Transport Branch of the Highways Office of the former Public Works Department. Units that moved to the Transport Department at this time were responsible for traffic engineering, traffic control and surveillance, road safety, and traffic surveys.

In 2019, the Transport Department headquarters moved from Immigration Tower to the new West Kowloon Government Offices in Yau Ma Tei.

In November 2020, it was reported that in 2019, the Transport Department changed one option of vehicle license plate searches from "others" to "other traffic and transport related matters," eliminating the ability of reporters to conduct license plate searches. Because of the change, RTHK reporter Bao Choy was charged with violating the Road Traffic Ordinance while producing a documentary on the 2019 Yuen Long attacks. In April 2021, Bao was found guilty, and in response, the Journalists Association said that press freedom was being undermined, stating "Today will be remembered and must be remembered in history... a reporter in Hong Kong who conducted vehicle searches to find out more about the Yuen Long attacks demonstrated the role of the media as a watchdog. The relentless effort of the journalist to find out the whole truth of the Yuen Long attack ... this is what the fourth power is about."

In January 2021, the Transportation Department announced a change to the system, where vehicle owners will be notified if their license plate is looked up. Journalists had previously used the tool for investigations, including to discover illegal structures at homes of senior government officials. In response, Carrie Lam defended the change, and claimed that "So I really don't see how this would undermine the work of the media, and hence I do not see why the media should be exempted from the administrative procedure that the Transport Department has put in place."

Role and responsibilities
 registration of vehicles in Hong Kong
 licensing of rail and bus operators in Hong Kong
 licensing offices
 all roads within Hong Kong 
 co-ownership of bridges and tunnels (mainly a public-private mix)
 18,000 on-street metered parking spaces
 traffic management
 transport planning

Leadership
The post of Commissioner for Transport is currently held by Rosanna Law. The Commissioner reports to the Secretary for Transport and Housing.

List of commissioners:
 Brian D. Wilson (1972–1974)
 Ian Macpherson (1974–1978)
 Alan Thomas Armstrong-Wright (1978–1982)
 Peter F. Leeds (1982–1987)
 James So Yiu-cho (1987–1989)
 Gordon Siu (1989–1992)
 Rafael Hui Si-yan (1992–1995)
 Lily Yam Kwan Pui-ying (1995–1997)
 Fanny Law Fan Chiu-fun (1997–1998)
 Robert Charles Law Footman (1998–2005)
 Alan Wong Chi-kong (2005–2009)
 Joseph Lai (2009–2012)
 Susie Ho Shuk-yee (July 2012 – October 2012)
 Ingrid Yeung (October 2012 – October 2017)
 Mable Chan (October 2017 – September 2020)
 Rosanna Law (September 2020 - now)

See also
 Driving licence in Hong Kong
 Hong Kong Strategic Route and Exit Number System
 Transport in Hong Kong
 List of tunnels and bridges in Hong Kong
 MTR Corporation
 MTR

References

External links

 

1968 establishments in Hong Kong
Hong Kong government departments and agencies
Motor vehicle registration agencies
Road transport in Hong Kong
Hong Kong